Pauli Sandström (25 December 1899 – 13 March 1988) was a Finnish athlete. He competed in the men's long jump at the 1924 Summer Olympics.

References

External links
 

1899 births
1988 deaths
Athletes (track and field) at the 1924 Summer Olympics
Finnish male long jumpers
Olympic athletes of Finland
Place of birth missing